Madeleine Bodo Essissima (born April 29, 1992) is a Cameroonian volleyball player. She was a member of the Cameroon women's national volleyball team at the 2016 Summer Olympics.

References

1992 births
Living people
Cameroonian women's volleyball players
Olympic volleyball players of Cameroon
Volleyball players at the 2016 Summer Olympics
21st-century Cameroonian women